Two classes of French submarines were known as the Saphir class: